Chase Buchanan and Blaž Rola won the title, beating Austin Krajicek and Nicholas Monroe 6–4, 6–7{5–7}, [10–4]

Seeds

Draw

References
 Main Draw

Cary Challenger - Doubles
2015 Doubles